The Laughlin Round Barn near Castle Rock, Washington is a round barn that was built in 1883.  It was listed on the National Register of Historic Places in 1986.

References

Infrastructure completed in 1883
Round barns in Washington (state)
Barns on the National Register of Historic Places in Washington (state)
National Register of Historic Places in Cowlitz County, Washington